Enrico Castellani (4 August 1930 – 1 December 2017) was an Italian artist. Castellani is known for his "paintings of light". He studied at the Ecole Nationale Superieure in Belgium, then settled in Milan. Castellani collaborated with artists such as Getulio Alviani, Piero Manzoni, and others. In 2010 he received the Praemium Imperiale for painting.

He died on 1 December 2017 at his home, the Castello Orsini of Celleno, in the province of Viterbo in Lazio.

References 

 Enrico Castellani, New Angular, Double Angular, 2009-2011 in "MozArt" - edited by Bruno Corà, Perugia, 3Arte - Ali&no editrice, n.1, 2012, p. 6-14 - ISBN 978-88-6254-092-6

External links 
 Art Directory: Enrico Castellani
 "Enrico Castellani's Formalist Poems in Silver and White" met diverse afbeeldingen
 Hauch of Venison: Enrico Castellani
 A tribute to Enrico Castellani with photos and interview from Cà Pesaro Venice exhibition, September 2012

1930 births
2017 deaths
20th-century Italian painters
20th-century Italian male artists
Italian male painters
21st-century Italian painters
Italian contemporary artists
21st-century Italian male artists
People from the Province of Rovigo